Ali al-Jundi (March 17, 1928 - August 7, 2009) was a renowned Syrian poet. He is considered one of the pioneers of Arabic free verse poetry.

Biography
Ali al-Jundi was born in Salamiyah, Syria in the Hama Governorate. He was from a well-known Ismaili family, although he himself rejected organized religions. His brother was politician Sami al-Jundi, and his cousin was Abd al-Karim al-Jundi. After graduating with a BA in Philosophy from Damascus University in 1955, he worked as a teacher and journalist in Damascus and Beirut, then as head of the Directorate of News and Media in Syria. He eventually became the editor of the main government newspaper, where he worked until his retirement. He was one of the founding members of the Arab Writers Union in 1962, of which he was made vice president in 1969. Following the death of Hafez al-Assad in 2000, he joined 98 other prominent Syrian intellectuals as a signatory of the Statement of 99.

He wrote poetry throughout most of his life. He died on August 7, 2009 and was buried in his hometown of Salamiyah near the grave of Muhammad al-Maghut.

Poetry 
Al-Jundi was one of several free verse poets who rejected traditional Arabic prosody in the early 1960s, part of a larger movement of Middle Eastern modernization at the time. The lack of steady meter and rhyming couplets was controversial, as was the investigation of more existential topics such as the nature of being, nothingness, and death. Though disdained by many contemporaries, the movement was well received by the younger generation in Beirut and soon gained popularity throughout the region.

Poetry collections 
 The Felled Banner, 1962
 In the Beginning There Was Silence, 1964
 Earthy Fever, 1969
 The Sun and the Fingers of the Dead, 1972
 The Black Mediterranean, 1975
 Tarafa in the Tropic of Cancer, 1975
 Bleeding Under the Skin, 1978
 Al-Rubaiyat, 1980
 Far Away In Silence, Close By in Forgetfulness, 1981
 Timed Poems, 1980
 Became Ashes, 1987
 A Swallow For the Last Light, 1992

References

External links
Syrian and Lebanese Literary Elite Mourn the Poet Ali Aljundi

Syrian poets
Syrian Ismailis
1928 births
2009 deaths
20th-century poets
10th-century Ismailis